"Live by the sword, die by the sword" is a proverb in the form of a parallel phrase, derived from the Gospel of Matthew (Matthew 26): "Then said Jesus unto him, Put up again thy sword into his place: for all they that take the sword shall perish with the sword."

Original Biblical quotation
The phrase comes from Matthew , in which one of Jesus's disciples is described as having struck the servant of the High Priest of Israel and cut off his ear. Jesus is described as having rebuked him, saying:

The saying "all they that take the sword shall perish with the sword" is only found in the Gospel of Matthew and not in any of the other gospels. The Latin version refers to the weapon as a gladius, while the Greek version refers to it as a makhaira.

Interpretations
Early Christian theologians were almost universally pacifists, with Justin Martyr, Hippolytus of Rome, Tertullian, and Origen all making strong statements against soldiering and bearing weapons.

According to St. John Chrysostom, when Jesus rebuked the unnamed disciple, it was a lesson that "The disciples might accept meekly whatever befell him when they had learned that this also is occurring according to God’s will". Thus, contrary to the common proverbial understanding, St. John Chrysostom explains where there is God's will (not the will of men) there is no need to react in passion.

The saying is sometimes interpreted to mean "those who live by violence will die by violence", which some have interpreted as a call for Christian pacifism or even complete nonviolence, including in self-defense.

In modern times, the saying may also be applied to those who knowingly engage in dangerous activities as part of their occupations or for entertainment purposes, but accept the risk of serious injury or death from those activities.

History
A very similar line can be found in the Agamemnon, the first play of the Oresteia trilogy by the ancient Greek tragedian and playwright Aeschylus. The line, spoken by Queen Clytemnestra of Mycenae after she murders her husband King Agamemnon in an act of vengeance, is rendered in the original Greek and translated to English (with varying levels of similarity to the original) as:

The line differs across translators and is variously understood as "live by the sword, die by the sword" or "an eye for an eye", emphasizing the irony or appropriateness of the means by which he was killed. The play, first performed in 458 BCE,  predates the similar concept espoused in the Gospel of Matthew, and remains popular to this day with regular performances  and readings.

References in popular culture

 The song “Live By The Sword” off of hyperpop artist Dorian Electra’s 2019 studio album, Flamboyant, is both named after the saying, and uses the saying in its hook.
 The saying is paraphrased in the slogan "live by the bomb, die by the bomb" used in the White House Peace Vigil protest.
 In the second verse of Geto Boys' song Mind Playing Tricks on Me, the idiom is used to describe the violent life the protagonist leads.

See also

 Violence begets violence

References

Bibliography

 

1st-millennium BC introductions
Aeschylus
Gospel of Matthew
Greek proverbs
Quotations from literature
New Testament words and phrases
Sayings of Jesus
Violence
Swords
Agamemnon